Neptis lermanni is a butterfly in the family Nymphalidae. It is found in the Democratic Republic of the Congo (Ubangi, Mongala, Uele, Tshopo, Equateur, Cataractes, Sankuru and Tanganika) and the Republic of the Congo.

References

Butterflies described in 1896
lermanni
Butterflies of Africa
Taxa named by Per Olof Christopher Aurivillius